The discography of multinational classical crossover vocal group Il Divo, contains ten studio albums, two live albums, one compilation album, singles and duets and collaborations.

Their debut album, Il Divo, was released in 2004 and went to number one in 13 countries worldwide. The Christmas Collection album was released in October 2005 and was certified 2× Platinum in Canada and Platinum in America. Their third album, Ancora, was released in 2005; it went to number one in America selling more than 150,000 copies during its first week. Their fourth album, Siempre, was released in 2006; it went to number one in ten countries. Their fifth album, The Promise was released in 2008 and went to number one in seven countries, Their sixth album, Wicked Game in 2011, their seventh album, A Musical Affair in 2013 and their eighth album, Amor & Pasión in 2015.

Albums

Studio albums

Live albums

Compilation albums

Special editions

Singles

Other singles
"Volta Pra mim", Portuguese version of "Regresa a mí (Unbreak My Heart)"
"With You I'm Born Again (Por ti vuelvo a nacer)"
"I Believe I Can Fly (Se que puedo volar)"
"Bridge over Troubled Water"
"The Impossible Dream"
"Hana wa Saku"
"Furusato"
"We Wish You a Merry Christmas"

Video albums

Music videos

Duets and collaborations

In soundtracks

Events
 FIFA World Cup: Il Divo & Toni Braxton "Time of Our Lives"

TV soaps
  TV soaps Sortilegio, song "Sortilegio de amor"

Duets

 Anggun ("Who Wants to Live Forever")
 Barbra Streisand ("The Music of the Night", "Somewhere", "Evergreen")
 Celine Dion ("I Believe in You (Je crois en toi)")
Engelbert Humperdick ("Spanish Eyes")
 Florent Pagny ("Belle")
 Heather Headley ("Can You Feel the Love Tonight?")
 Hélène Segara ("Memory")
 Juan Gabriel ("Amor eterno")
 Katherine Jenkins ("Somewhere")
 Kristin Chenoweth ("Do You Hear What I Hear?", "All I Ask of You")
 Lea Salonga ("A Whole New World", "Time to say goodbye (Con Te Partirò)", "Can You Feel the Love Tonight?")
 Leona Lewis ("Somewhere")
 Lisa Angell ("[[Can You Feel the Love Tonight?")
 Mazz Murray ("Memory", "Time to say goodbye (Con Te Partirò)", "Music of the Night")
 Michael Ball ("Love Changes Everything")
 Natasha St-Pier ("Aimer")
 Nicole Scherzinger ("Memory")
 Sonia Lacen ("L'envie d'aimer")
 Vincent Niclo ("Le Temps Des Cathédrales")

Collaborations records of other artists

On Ne Change Pas with Celine Dion on "I Believe in You (Je crois en toi)" (2005)
Voices from the FIFA World Cup on the song "The Time of Our Lives" (2006)
 Libra by Toni Braxton on the song "The Time of Our Lives" (2006)
 Live in Concert by Barbra Streisand on the song "Evergreen" (2006)
 Engelbert Calling by Engelbert Humperdick on the song "Spanish Eyes" (2014)
  Los Dúos by Juan Gabriel on the song "Amor eterno" (2015)

References

Pop music group discographies
Il Divo